Hamidiye may refer to:

 Hamidiye (cavalry), irregular Ottoman cavalry units established in 1890
 Ottoman cruiser Hamidiye, a warship of the Balkan wars and World War I
 Hamidiye, Bigadiç, a village
 Hamidiye, Bolvadin, a village in the District of Bolvadin, Afyonkarahisar Province, Turkey
 Hamidiye, Ceyhan, a village in the District of Ceyhan, Adana Province, Turkey
 Hamidiye, Nurdağı, a village in the Nurdağı District, Gaziantep Province, Turkey
 Hamidiye, Pozantı, a village in the District of Pozantı, Adana Province, Turkey
 Mesudiye, Ordu, former name

See also
 Hamidi (disambiguation)
 Hamidiyah
 Hamidiyeh
 Al-Hamidiyah (formerly in the Ottoman Empire, now in Syria)